Karl Larson (born 28 October 1991) is a Swedish footballer, who plays for Swedish club Sirius in the Allvenskan.

References

External links 
 

Swedish footballers
Allsvenskan players
Superettan players
1991 births
Living people
Gröndals IK players
IF Brommapojkarna players
IK Sirius Fotboll players
Association football defenders
Footballers from Stockholm